Harman and Co. was a well-known and respected English banking firm in the City of London. It was founded around 1740 by Quaker partners Jonathan Gurnell (1684-1753) (who married in 1711 Grizell Wilmer of Pitzhanger Manor) and Joseph Hoare (d. 1729), and was in business until 1846. The firm traded extensively with Portugal and were agents for the Russian Imperial Court in St. Petersburg.

The firm had close ties to the Society for Effecting the Abolition of the Slave Trade The only surviving brother of one of its founders was the abolitionist Samuel Hoare Jr. Jeremiah Harman, son of one of the early investors, was one of the first merchants to liquidate his slave related holdings.

The firm changed names several times, finally settling on Harman and Co.

 Gurnell and Hoare c. 1750 - c. 1754 at Frederick Place in Old Jewry, London. Samuel Hoare Sr, son-in-law, was involved in the company from the beginning. When his grandson John Harman joined the firm, the name was changed to Gurnell, Hoare, and Harman.
 Gurnell, Hoare, Harman & Co. (Sometimes Gurnell, Hoare, and Harman or Gurnell, Hoare & Co) c.1754 - c. 1783 at Frederick Place in Old Jewry, London. Henry Hope, later a significant international merchant banker, apprenticed in the firm during 1754-1760
 Harman, Hoare, and Co. c.1786 - c.1792 at Frederick Place in Old Jewry, London
 Harman and Co. c.1804-1846 at Adam's Court of Old Broad Street, London. John's son Jeremiah (above) took over as a principal partner. He was a well-known banker, from 1816-1818 Governor of the Bank of England, and remained head of the firm until his death in 1844. The business was left to the two remaining partners: Edward Harman and Henry Harman.

References 

Private banks
History of banking
Defunct banks of the United Kingdom